Maquoketa is a city in Jackson County, Iowa, United States. Located on the Maquoketa River, it is the county seat of Jackson County.

U.S. Route 61 adjoins the city, which therefore hosts traffic between Dubuque and the Quad Cities. Iowa Highways 62 and 64 also pass through the city. Maquoketa Caves State Park is located a few miles northwest of Maquoketa.

The population was 6,128 at the time of the 2020 census.

History 
Maquoketa was originally called Springfield, and under the latter name was laid out in 1838. The present name, after the Maquoketa River, was adopted in 1844.  The river's name derives from Maquaw-Autaw, which means "Bear River" in Meskwaki.

The Davenport and St. Paul Railroad was extended to Maquoketa in 1870 prompting growth. The county seat was transferred from Andrew to Maquoketa in 1873.

Demographics

2010 census
As of the census of 2010, there were 6,141 people, 2,655 households, and 1,612 families residing in the city. The racial makeup of the city was 95.0% White, 0.7% African American, 0.4% Native American, 0.3% Asian, 1.3% Pacific Islander, 0.6% from other races, and 1.7% from two or more races. Hispanic or Latino of any race were 1.8% of the population.

There were 2,655 households, of which 29.9% had children under the age of 18 living with them, 42.7% were married couples living together, 13.5% had a female householder with no husband present, 4.5% had a male householder with no wife present, and 39.3% were non-families. 34.5% of all households were made up of individuals, and 16.3% had someone living alone who was 65 years of age or older. The average household size was 2.26 and the average family size was 2.88.

The median age in the city was 41 years. 24.4% of residents were under the age of 18; 7.2% were between the ages of 18 and 24; 23.5% were from 25 to 44; 25.7% were from 45 to 64; and 19.3% were 65 years of age or older. The gender makeup of the city was 47.2% male and 52.8% female.

2000 census
As of the census of 2000, there were 6,112 people, 2,614 households, and 1,599 families residing in the city. The racial makeup of the city was 98.10% White, 0.16% African American, 0.21% Native American, 0.11% Asian, 0.34% Pacific Islander, 0.34% from other races, and 0.72% from two or more races. Hispanic or Latino of any race were 0.98% of the population.

There were 2,614 households, out of which 29.1% had children under the age of 18 living with them, 46.4% were married couples living together, 11.1% had a female householder with no husband present, and 38.8% were non-families. 34.3% of all households were made up of individuals, and 18.1% had someone living alone who was 65 years of age or older. The average household size was 2.26 and the average family size was 2.90.

Age spread: 24.4% under the age of 18, 8.3% from 18 to 24, 25.2% from 25 to 44, 20.6% from 45 to 64, and 21.4% who were 65 years of age or older. The median age was 40 years. For every 100 females, there were 87.8 males. For every 100 females age 18 and over, there were 81.0 males.

The median income for a household in the city was $28,984, and the median income for a family was $36,705. Males had a median income of $25,819 versus $19,421 for females. The per capita income for the city was $16,360. About 9.1% of families and 12.3% of the population were below the poverty line, including 18.6% of those under age 18 and 8.6% of those age 65 or over.

Geography
Maquoketa is located at  (42.066901, −90.666238), primarily in Jackson County.

Climate

Government
Maquoketa is governed by the Mayor with city council form of government, with several departments, boards, and commissions.

The council votes on and passes motions, resolutions and ordinances. Resolutions are statements of policy and ordinances are the laws of the city. The votes of each council member are recorded in the minutes of the meeting. The council also approves expenditures and the budget, contracts, city policies and zoning changes.

Mayor
	
The mayor is Don Schwenker. The mayor is the city's chief executive officer and presides over council meetings.

Current Mayor: Don Schwenker

City Council

The city council members are (listed by seniority):

Joshua Collister (2010)
Kevin Kuhlman (2015)
Mark Lyon (2017)
Jacob Baker (2018)
Jessica Kean (2018)
Erica Barker (2018)
Ronald Horan Jr. (2018)

 City Manager

Maquoketa's day-to-day operations are run by the city manager, Gerald Smith

Education

Public schools 
The Maquoketa Community School District, in partnership with the community, oversees the public school system of education for the city of Maquoketa and the surrounding area.

The Maquoketa High School, home of the Cardinals, has enrollment of approximately 620 students, grades 9 through 12, with a staff of over 50 educators and administrators.

The Maquoketa Middle School is the oldest school building in Maquoketa due to it being built in 1922 after the previous structure burned down, formally a home to a junior high, high school and junior college. The school has approximately 375 students, grades 6 through 8, with a staff of over 60 educators and administrators.

Briggs Elementary School, built in 1954, is named after Ansel Briggs, the first Governor of Iowa, who was an early settler in Jackson County. The school has approximately 300 students, grades 3 through 5, with a staff of 35 educators and administrators.

Cardinal Elementary School, built in 1974, started as a school for grades 1 through 6. Gradual changes were made to the building and the grade levels taught. The decision to teach only kindergarten through 2nd grade was implemented at Cardinal in May 2002. The school has a staff of 37 educators and administrators.

Private 
Sacred Heart Elementary School is a Catholic school teaching preschool through the sixth grade. The current  school enrollment (see references) has 132 students and 20 staff.

Preschools 
The Little Shepherd Preschool operates in the lower levels of the First Lutheran Church of Maquoketa.

Sunshine Preschool and Daycare is a nonprofit organization started in 1973. All  children age 6 months up to 12 years of age including those with disabilities are accepted. Currently (see references) there are 145 children with 30 staff.

College 
Clinton Community College added a Maquoketa campus right next to the Maquoketa High School. The 11,000 square foot facility opened in 2009 and offers associate degrees and non-credit training. They also offer classes to high school students to supplement their high school education.

Attractions 

 Maquoketa Caves State Park
 Hurstville Lime Kilns, north of Maquoketa
 Jackson County Iowa Historical Society
 Clinton Engines Museum
 61 Drive-in theater
Camp Shalom Inc.
 The town also holds host to a historic district containing many great examples of Victorian architecture.
Despite its size, the town also attracts many presidential candidates. 2008 Democratic presidential candidate Barack Obama visited the town twice during his campaign and again while president on August 16, 2011.
The Old City Hall Gallery displays the oil paintings of International-known Maquoketa artist Rose Frantzen, whose exhibit "Portrait of Maquoketa", the oil paintings of 180 residents of Maquoketa, was once on display at the Smithsonian National Portrait Gallery in Washington, DC. It is now housed in the permanent collection of the Figge Art Museum in Davenport, Iowa.

Notable people

Norris Brown, Senator from Nebraska
Craig Callahan, professional basketball player
James H. Cartwright, Illinois Supreme Court justice
Betty Francis, All-American Girls Professional Baseball League player
Herbert E. Hitchcock, Senator from South Dakota
Charles Wycliffe Joiner, US federal judge
Matthew Luckiesh, physicist
Junius Ralph Magee, former Methodist bishop
Eben Martin, former US Representative
Robert A. Millikan, Nobel Prize laureate
Joseph Otting, Businessman and 31st Comptroller of the Currency
Sage Rosenfels, former quarterback in the NFL
George Homer Ryan, former Governor of Illinois
William Welch, originated the printing of high school diplomas

References

External links 

 
Official Maquoketa City Website Portal website, City government, Chamber of Commerce, Economic development, Tourism
Maquoketa Community School District
Maquoketa Area Chamber of Commerce
City Data Comprehensive Statistical Data and more about Maquoketa

 
Cities in Iowa
Cities in Clinton County, Iowa
Cities in Jackson County, Iowa
County seats in Iowa
Populated places established in 1838
1838 establishments in Iowa Territory